Nicolas James Lentz (born December 28, 1989) is an American umpire in Major League Baseball.  He made his debut on April 20, 2016, in Miami. He wears number 59, which was most recently worn by former umpire Jon Byrne.

During the 2016 season, Lentz umpired 105 MLB games, 24 as the home plate umpire. Lentz's first MLB ejection came on May 17, 2017, when he ejected St. Louis Cardinals' manager Mike Matheny. In July 2017, Lentz was the first base umpire for the Triple-A All-Star Game. He umpired 109 MLB games during the 2017 season, 25 behind the plate.

On August 31, 2018, Lentz ejected New York Yankees' manager Aaron Boone. Boone, who had been in the dugout, was displeased with a strike call Lentz made during a Gleyber Torres at-bat. Boone came on to the field and became quite animated, including crouching behind home plate in a catcher's stance, apparently demonstrating to Lentz the difference between balls and strikes.

See also 
 List of Major League Baseball umpires

References

External links
 Retrosheet
 
 Photo via Getty Images

1989 births
Living people
Major League Baseball umpires
Sportspeople from Grand Rapids, Michigan